Voorst may refer to:
 The aristocratic van Voorst tot Voorst family
 Berend-Jan van Voorst tot Voorst (born 1944), Dutch politician and diplomat
 Eduardus van Voorst tot Voorst (1874-1945), Dutch sport shooter
 Herman van Voorst tot Voorst (1886-1971), Dutch Army officer and politician 
 Jan Joseph Godfried baron van Voorst tot Voorst (1880-1963), officer of the Dutch armed forces
 Carol van Voorst (born 1952), American diplomat

 Voorst, municipality and town in Gelderland
 Voorst, Limburg in Roerdalen
 Voorst, Oude IJsselstreek in Gelderland